Salvatore Anthony "Torey" Lovullo (born July 25, 1965) is an American professional baseball manager for the Arizona Diamondbacks of Major League Baseball (MLB), appointed November 4, 2016.

He also served as Boston's interim manager for the final seven weeks of the 2015 season when his boss, John Farrell, stepped aside for successful treatment for lymphoma. Lovullo compiled a win–loss record of 28–20 (.583) from August 14, 2015, through the final day of the season, October 4. His earlier managing career included service in the Cleveland Indians' and Red Sox' farm systems (2002–10).

Lovullo is from Santa Monica, California, and attended University of California, Los Angeles.

Playing career
He was first selected by the Kansas City Royals in the 27th round of the 1986 MLB draft, but did not sign. The Detroit Tigers then selected him in the fifth round of the 1987 MLB draft, and made his major-league debut with the Tigers on September 10, 1988. He also played in MLB for the New York Yankees, California Angels, Seattle Mariners, Oakland Athletics, Cleveland Indians, and Philadelphia Phillies. He appeared in his final major-league game on October 3, 1999. After his MLB career ended, Lovullo spent one season in Japan as a member of the Yakult Swallows in 2000.

Lovullo first reached the major leagues for a brief trial in September 1988, during his second professional season. Replacing Tom Brookens at third base in the late innings of a 9–4 Tiger loss to the Yankees at Yankee Stadium on September 10, he singled off Rick Rhoden in his first major-league at bat. Lovullo played one full season and parts of seven others in MLB. In his only full campaign, with the 1993 California Angels, he appeared in 116 games and collected 92 hits for a career-high .251 batting average.  He was the Angels' most-used second baseman, starting in 79 of the team's 162 games.  He was a teammate that season of pitcher John Farrell, and formed an association that influenced Lovullo's managerial and coaching career.

Overall, Lovullo appeared in 303 MLB games, including 133 at second base, and 67 each at first base and third base. He batted .224 (165-for-737), with 15 home runs and 60 runs batted in (RBIs). In Nippon Professional Baseball in 2000, he played in only 29 games and batted .197 with one home run and two RBIs.

Lovullo's long minor league playing career — 1,433 games with 1,193 hits, and a batting average of .267 — included extended stays with the Toledo Mud Hens, Columbus Clippers and Buffalo Bisons. He later returned to manage in both Buffalo and Columbus.

Coaching and managing career

Minor league manager
Lovullo's off-field career began in the Cleveland organization in 2001 as a minor league infield coach. After Farrell joined the Indians' front office as director of player development that November, Lovullo became the manager of the 2002 Columbus (Georgia) RedStixx of the Class A South Atlantic League, and guided them to the finals of the SAL playoffs.  He then moved up to the High Class A Kinston Indians (2003–04) and the Double-A Akron Aeros (2005), which he piloted to an 84–58 win–loss record and the Eastern League championship. His 2005 success led to his first MLB managerial audition, when he was invited to interview for the vacant managerial job for the Los Angeles Dodgers prior to the 2006 season.  When the Dodgers settled on Grady Little for their manager position, Lovullo resumed managing in the Indians' organization as skipper of the Buffalo Bisons, the Tribe's Triple-A affiliate.

During Lovullo's playing career, he had spent all or parts of three seasons (1995; 1997–98) as a player for the Bisons and won two championships: one in the American Association and one in the International League. In 2003, he also had received the highest honor awarded to an alumnus of Buffalo baseball, as he was inducted into the Buffalo Baseball Hall of Fame, alongside his teammate from the 1997 and 1998 championship squads, Jeff Manto.  In three campaigns (2006–08) as the Bisons' manager, he led the club to two winning records, and compiled a mark of 214–212. He also interviewed for the Pittsburgh Pirates' managerial vacancy after the 2007 season.

In 2009, the Indians changed their Triple-A affiliation from Buffalo to the Columbus (Ohio) Clippers of the International League.  Lovullo had played for the Clippers in 1991–92 when the team was the Yankees' top farm club. The Clippers were the International League champions in both seasons Lovullo played in Columbus, winning back-to-back Governors' Cup trophies.  In 2009, his only season as the Clippers' manager, the team compiled a 57–85 (.401) record, but Lovullo was recruited by the Boston Red Sox to take over their Triple-A team, the Pawtucket Red Sox, for 2010. It was his first season in the Boston organization, although both Farrell (as pitching coach) and another former Cleveland farm system official, Mike Hazen (as director of player development), were playing key roles with the Red Sox.  Lovullo's 2010 PawSox finished 66–78 (.458) and out of the playoffs, fourth in the Northern Division of the International League.

During his minor league managing career, Lovullo was named "Manager of the Year" in both the Carolina League (2004) and the Eastern League (2005). For the latter season, he also was named Double-A Manager of the Year by Baseball America. His nine-year (2002–10) win–loss record as a minor league manager is 661–609 (.520).

Major league coach

 
At the close of the 2010 season, Farrell, then considered a top Major League managerial candidate, was hired as the manager of the Toronto Blue Jays for 2011.  He named Lovullo to his Toronto coaching staff on November 8, 2010, to replace Omar Malavé as the club's first-base coach, and he served two seasons in that capacity.

After the 2012 season, the Red Sox began negotiations with the Blue Jays to release Farrell from his contract so that he could return to Boston as manager for 2013.  Ultimately, the Red Sox acquired the rights to Farrell in an October 21 trade for infielder Mike Avilés.  Upon being named the Red Sox' manager, Farrell hired Lovullo on October 26, 2012, as his bench coach. After the Red Sox won the 2013 World Series, Lovullo was mentioned as a potential candidate to succeed Dale Sveum as manager of the Chicago Cubs for 2014, but he returned as Boston's bench coach.  Then, upon the close of the 2014 season, Lovullo interviewed for managerial openings with the Texas Rangers and Minnesota Twins, but was a runner-up in each case.

Interim manager
On August 11, 2015, Farrell underwent hernia surgery, leaving Lovullo in charge of the team. Three days later, Farrell announced that during the surgery, it was found that he had Stage 1 lymphoma. The Red Sox named Lovullo manager for the remainder of the 2015 season while Farrell underwent chemotherapy.

The Red Sox showed a significant improvement in performance under Lovullo, scoring 37 runs in their first 2 games after he took over, and recording a .636 winning percentage through the end of September, compared with a .439 winning percentage on the season under Farrell. A high point came near the end of the season when the Red Sox posted a six-game winning streak and moved up to third place in the AL East. However, the team lost their last four games and ultimately finished at the bottom of their division for the second year in a row.

On October 1, 2015, it was reported that, if healthy, Farrell would return to his position as Red Sox manager at the beginning of the 2016 season, leaving Lovullo's position with the organization uncertain after his performance as interim manager. It was announced that Lovullo would resume his bench coach duties for the 2016 season on October 4, 2015, with Farrell returning as manager. Lovullo was also given a two-year contract extension in exchange for forgoing his right to pursue managerial job offerings. The 2016 season was Lovullo's fourth consecutive season with the Red Sox, and his sixth straight overall as an aide to Farrell.

Arizona Diamondbacks manager
Mike Hazen, who had worked with Lovullo with both the Indians and Red Sox, was named the new general manager of the Arizona Diamondbacks on October 16, 2016. Almost three weeks later, on November 4, Hazen appointed Lovullo to replace Chip Hale as the Diamondbacks' manager for the 2017 season. Hazen hired Lovullo over fellow managerial finalist Phil Nevin. In his first season as manager, he guided the team to the postseason, winning the NL Wild Card Game and finishing with a record of 93 wins and 69 losses, a 24-game improvement for the team from 2016. For his efforts, Lovullo was named 2017 National League Manager of the Year.

During the April 7, 2018 game against the St. Louis Cardinals, Lovullo was ejected in the second inning after an argument with umpire Tim Timmons resulted in a fight with Cardinals catcher Yadier Molina by calling him a choice word; the Diamondbacks won that night, 4-1, thus making it Lovullo's 100th managerial victory, as well as marking him the fastest manager in Diamondbacks history to win 100 games with the team. Lovullo and Molina were suspended for a game. In January 2019, Lovullo and the Diamondbacks agreed to a two-year contract extension, through the 2021 season. The team announced a second extension for Lovullo on September 23, 2021, through the 2022 season.

Managerial records

Personal life

Lovullo was born in Santa Monica, California, and raised in the San Fernando Valley. The youngest of four children, he has two sisters and one brother. He attended Montclair High School where he was part of California Interscholastic Federation (CIF) championship baseball teams in 1981 and 1982. He was named small schools player of the year in 1983. He is sixth on the CIF all-time career runs scored list, with 142. He was also part of the CIF basketball championship team in 1981 and runner-up in 1982.

Lovullo graduated from UCLA with a degree in Social Science. While at UCLA, he was honored as first-team All-American second baseman by Baseball America, the American Baseball Coaches Association and Sporting News in 1987. At the time of his graduation, he held the UCLA career records for home runs (51), hits (266), RBI’s (188), runs scored (211), walks (180), and at bats (856).

His father, Sam Lovullo, was the producer and co-creator of the long-running syndicated television country comedy variety show Hee Haw and its spinoff series Hee Haw Honeys. Sam was the producer of many other television shows and specials. Before his death in 2017, Sam was the recipient of many awards for his innovative production methods in television. He also received many awards in his lifetime for his contributions to several organizations, including receiving the Italian Federation's man of the year award.

Lovullo has one daughter and two sons. Two children are from his first marriage to Lynn Tobey Goldfield. His youngest child is from his current marriage to Kristen Burwell. Son Nick Lovullo played baseball professionally during 2013–2021.

References

External links

1965 births
Living people
Baseball coaches from California
American expatriate baseball players in Canada
American expatriate baseball players in Japan
Arizona Diamondbacks managers
Baseball players from California
Boston Red Sox coaches
Boston Red Sox managers
Buffalo Bisons (minor league) managers
Buffalo Bisons (minor league) players
Calgary Cannons players
California Angels players
Cleveland Indians players
Columbus Clippers players
Detroit Tigers players
Edmonton Trappers players
Glens Falls Tigers players
Fayetteville Generals players
Lakeland Tigers players
Major League Baseball bench coaches
Major League Baseball first base coaches
Major League Baseball first basemen
Major League Baseball second basemen
Major League Baseball shortstops
Major League Baseball third basemen
Manager of the Year Award winners
New York Yankees players
Nippon Professional Baseball infielders
Oakland Athletics players
Ottawa Lynx players
Pawtucket Red Sox managers
Philadelphia Phillies players
Scranton/Wilkes-Barre Red Barons players
Seattle Mariners players
Toledo Mud Hens players
Toronto Blue Jays coaches
UCLA Bruins baseball players
Yakult Swallows players
All-American college baseball players